Native titanium (IMA2010-044) is a naturally occurring form of the metal titanium. It can be found in the Luobusa mining district, Luobusha fault zone (Yarlung Zangbo suture zone), Qusum County, Shannan, Tibet.

References

Hexagonal minerals
Native element minerals
Minerals in space group 194
Titanium